There are several rivers named Conceição River in Brazil:

 Conceição River (Ceará)
 Conceição River (Rio de Janeiro)
 Conceição River (Rio Grande do Sul)